Maria Gabriella Baers (20 September 1883 – 30 December 1959) was a Belgian senator, feminist, and trade unionist. Baers was the founder of Nationaal Verbond der Christelijke Vrouwengilden (National Union of Christian Women's Guilds. nowadays). In 1945, she became the first women Secretary of the Senate, and the first chairwomen of a parliamentary commission.

Biography
Baers was born on 20 September 1883 in Antwerp. She went to high school at the Sœurs of Notre-Dame and was therefore fluent in both Dutch and French. She studied social sciences at the University of Freiburg.

In 1908, Baers joined the local women union in Antwerp for lace workers and
glove makers. In 1912, Baers and  founded the Algemeen Secretariaat der Christelijke Vrouwenvakverenigingen (General Secretary of Christian Women Unions). Baers moved to Brussels, and in 1920 founded the Nationaal Verbond der Christelijke Vrouwengilden (National Union of Christian Women's Guilds), an emancipated movement for working-class women which is nowadays called . Baers would head the organisation until 1951.

In 1936, Baers was elected to the Belgian Senate and remain a senator until 1954. Baers would remain senator during World War II. She wanted to prevent forced labour of Belgian women in Germany. Together with J. Vervaeck of the Ministry of Labour, they managed to stop deportation of women under the age of 24, however Baers continued to increase pressure. On 22 March 1943, all deportations of women ended.

In 1945, Baers became the first women Secretary of the Senate, and became Chairperson of the Parliamentary Commission on Health.

On 30 December 1959, Baers died in Brussels at the age of 76. In 1998, the auditorium of the Flemish Community was named after Maria Baers.

References

Bibliography
 

1883 births
1959 deaths
Women members of the Senate (Belgium)
Christian Social Party (Belgium, defunct) politicians
Belgian feminists
Politicians from Antwerp
Belgian trade unionists
University of Freiburg alumni